Rashid Khadr (born 1928) was an Egyptian middle-distance runner. He competed in the men's 800 metres at the 1948 Summer Olympics.

References

External links

1928 births
Possibly living people
Athletes (track and field) at the 1948 Summer Olympics
Egyptian male middle-distance runners
Olympic athletes of Egypt
Place of birth missing (living people)